Space Group is an architecture office established in 1999 in Oslo, Norway and created by Gary Bates and Gro Bonesmo. Prior to founding Space Group, they worked with OMA/Rem Koolhaas, which they later on collaborated for the Vestbanen project in Oslo.

The firm is also known for leading large master plan development and research. One of their current involvements is for the project "8 million city"/Station City, connecting Oslo to Copenhagen by train. They were the curators of the Nordic Pavilion at the 14th International Architecture Exhibition at the Venice Biennale in 2014.

Notable work 

 Verkstedhallen, Aker Brygge, Oslo (completed 2014)
 Aker Brygge Masterplan, Oslo (completed 2014)
 Nedregate Cultural District, Oslo (completed 2013)
 Trondheim Clarion Hotel & Congress, Trondheim (completed 2012)
 Luftfartstilsynet - Norwegian Civil Aviation HQ, Bodø (completed 2011) 
 Blue Moon House SRH, Groningen (completed 2001)
 Varner House, Asker (completed 2003)

Main competitions 
 2012 Nye Ruten with Superunion (Sandnes, Norway)
 2010 Opera And Culture House with Brisac Gonzalez (Kristiansand, Norway)
 2008 Oslo Central Station (Oslo, Norway)
 2008 Luftfartstilsynet - Norwegian Civil Aviation HQ (Bodø, Norway)
 2002 Oslo West Station Library & Museum with OMA and REX Architecture (Oslo, Norway)

Selected awards 
  2013 Metall 13, Clarion Hotel and Congress Trondheim, Norway
  2013 Oslo bys arkitekturpris Nedregate Culture District / Nedregate 5-7, Oslo, Norway
  2012 DNB Eiendomspris Clarion Hotel and Congress Trondheim, Norway
  2012 Houens Fund Diploma Varner House, Asker, Norway
  2005 European Steel Award Varner House, Asker, Norway
  2005 International Architectural Biennal Rotterdam, curator Adriaan Geuze – ‘THE FLOOD’ Catamaran City

Publication 
 SPACEGROUP, Norway: Untitled 2000-2008 DD30  Damdi Publishing Company Publishers. 2008.

Exhibitions 
 2015 Snapshot Galleri Rom, Oslo
 2015 Forms of Freedom. African Independence and Nordic Models, Nasjonalmuseet – Arkitektur, Fehn-paviljongen 
 2014 Forms of Freedom curator of Nordic Pavilion, Venice Biennale
 2011 From Skin to Flesh  Galeria Eduardo Fernandes, São Paulo, curated by Ricardo de Ostos
 2012 Light Houses: On the Nordic Common Ground. Nordic Pavilion, Venice Biennale
 2004 SPACE GROUP: Exposed Experiment Change, Galleri Rom, Oslo

References

External links 
 SPACEGROUP official website

Design companies established in 1999
Norwegian companies established in 1999
Companies based in Oslo
Architecture firms of Norway